A New England: The Very Best of Kirsty MacColl is a compilation album by British singer-songwriter Kirsty MacColl. It was released by Union Square Music in 2013 and reached No. 41 in the UK. The standard edition of the compilation contains 21 tracks. A limited edition release exclusive to Amazon was also issued with a bonus disc of 10 promotional videos and five art cards.

Reception

Stephen Unwin of the Daily Express wrote: "No one ever quite matched [MacColl] in terms of pulling together lovely melodies and witty lyrics. This great collection rounds them all up."

Track listing

Charts

References

Kirsty MacColl albums
2013 compilation albums